Malcolm X (1925–1965) was an African American Muslim minister, public speaker, and human rights activist.

Malcolm X may also refer to:
 Malcolm X (1972 film), a documentary film
 Malcolm X (1992 film), a biographical film starring Denzel Washington as Malcolm X
 Malcolm X (soundtrack)
 Malcolm X: A Life of Reinvention, a 2011 biography
 X, The Life and Times of Malcolm X, an opera by Anthony Davis
 Malcolm X: Make It Plain, a 1994 documentary
 Malcolm X College, a college in Chicago
 Malcolm X Liberation University, an education institute in North Carolina from 1969 to 1973
"Malcolm X", song by Bongi Makeba, performed in 1972 and recorded in 1974 by Miriam Makeba

See also
 Malcolm X. Hamilton, former American footballer
 Malcolm X House Site, the house Malcolm X first lived in
 Malcolm X Park, Philadelphia, a park in Philadelphia, Pennsylvania
 Meridian Hill/Malcolm X Park, a park in Washington, DC
 Malcolm X Park (album), a 1988 album by Unrest
 Malcolm X Shabazz High School, a high school in New Jersey